Izcalli is the name of the eighteenth and last month of the Aztec calendar. It is also a festival  in the Aztec religion, for which the principal deity is Xiuhtecuhtli the fire God. Old people are honored this month and it is known as Rebirth Month.

References

Aztec calendars
Aztec mythology and religion